Dovolená s Andělem is a 1952 Czechoslovak film. The film starred Josef Kemr.

Cast
Jaroslav Marvan as Gustav Andel
Josef Pehr as Václav Masek
Josef Kemr as Bohous Vyhlídka
Vladimír Ráž as Karel Pavlát
Jana Dítětová as Milada Pavlátová
František Dibarbora as Stefan Palko
Stanislava Seimlová as Marienka Vanecková
Bela Jurdová as Cultural officer
Vladimír Repa as Vojtech Herzán
Rudolf Princ as Administrator of convalescence home
Alena Vránová as Marie Dobesová
Eva Foustková as Anna Kazdová
Růžena Šlemrová as Pichlová
Josef Hlinomaz as Jerábek
Antonin Vilsky as Stehlík

References

External links
 

1952 films
1950s Czech-language films
Czechoslovak comedy films
1952 comedy films
1950s Czech films